Brillantaisia lancifolia is a species of plant in the family Acanthaceae. It is found in Cameroon, Gabon, and Nigeria. Its natural habitats are subtropical or tropical moist lowland forests and rivers. It is threatened by habitat loss.

References

Acanthaceae
Vulnerable plants
Taxonomy articles created by Polbot